Vakhrameyev, Vakhrameev, Vahrameev (masculine), Vakhrameyeva, Vakhrameeva, Vahrameeva (feminineine) are transliterations of the Russian surname Вахрамеев / Вахрамеевa. Notable people with the surname include:
 
Alexander Vakhrameyev, Russian artist
Dmitry Vakhrameev, musician of Russian band Kukuruza
Ivan Vakhrameev (1885 – 1965) Russian navy sailor and revolutionary
 (1904—1976), Soviet Major General
, Hero of the Soviet Union

Russian-language surnames